Whitewater Creek is a stream within a canyon in Catron County, western New Mexico, United States. It lies along the northwest boundary of the Gila Wilderness, in the Mogollon Mountains. It features the Catwalk National Recreation Trail, including a picnic area.  The towns of Mogollon and Glenwood are near the west end of the creek.

Gallery

See also

 List of rivers in New Mexico

References

External links

Rivers of New Mexico
Bodies of water of Catron County, New Mexico